The Dutch Eredivisie in the 1958–59 season was contested by 18 teams. Sparta won the championship.

League standings

Results

See also
 1958–59 Eerste Divisie
 1958–59 Tweede Divisie

References

 Eredivisie official website - info on all seasons 
 RSSSF

Eredivisie seasons
1958–59 in Dutch football
Neth